Meet the In-Laws is a 2012 Chinese comedy film directed by Li Haishu.

Plot
Psychologist Fan Jianqiang (Xu Zheng) travels with his girlfriend Su Xi (Lin Peng) from Shanghai to her home in Hangzhou, to meet her parents for the first time. Things get off to a rocky start when Fan discovers that his prospective father-in-law Su Bohu (Benz Hui) is actually one of his patients who had disclosed to him all his secrets.

References

External links

Chinese comedy films
Films directed by Li Haishu